Rodrigo Nascimento de Oliveira Luz (born 6 March 1995), commonly known as Rodrigo Fumaça, is a Brazilian footballer who currently plays as a forward for ABC.

Career statistics

Club

Notes

References

1995 births
Living people
Brazilian footballers
Brazilian expatriate footballers
Association football forwards
CR Flamengo footballers
Audax Rio de Janeiro Esporte Clube players
Esporte Clube Vitória players
CR Vasco da Gama players
Boavista F.C. players
Macaé Esporte Futebol Clube players
Associação Desportiva Itaboraí players
Sampaio Corrêa Futebol e Esporte players
Luverdense Esporte Clube players
Cuiabá Esporte Clube players
Ituano FC players
K.S.V. Roeselare players
Manaus Futebol Clube players
ABC Futebol Clube players
Brasiliense Futebol Clube players
Campeonato Brasileiro Série B players
Campeonato Brasileiro Série C players
Campeonato Brasileiro Série D players
Challenger Pro League players
Brazilian expatriate sportspeople in Belgium
Expatriate footballers in Belgium
Footballers from Rio de Janeiro (city)